Tapori can refer to:

 Tapori, a worldwide network of children that is part of the International NGO ATD Fourth World
 Tapori (film) (English title: Wanted), a 2009 Bollywood film 
 Tapori (word), a Hindi language word
Tapoli or Tapori, a Lusitanian tribe